The men's 400 metres was an event at the 1960 Summer Olympics in Rome. The competition was held between September 3 and September 6, 1960. 59 competitors from 44 nations entered, but 54 competitors from 41 nations participated. The maximum number of athletes per nation had been set at 3 since the 1930 Olympic Congress. The event was won by Otis Davis of the United States, the second consecutive and ninth overall title in the event for an American. Carl Kaufmann's silver was the second straight silver for a German in the event, while Malcolm Spence's bronze was the first medal for South Africa in the 400 metres since 1920.

Summary

This race was settled via photo finish using one of the first experimental attempts at fully automatic timing. Carl Kaufmann made a diving lunge at the finish line, his head crossing the line first. But it is the torso that counts and Otis Davis, running upright had his body ahead of Kaufmann. After a suspenseful pause, Davis was ruled the winner. The photo was made further famous after being published in Life Magazine. In fourth place, Milkha Singh ran the Indian national record that lasted 44 years until the 2004 Olympics.

There is potential confusion with two athletes in the competition named Malcolm Spence, both qualifying to the second semifinal. The (one year) younger Malcolm Spence representing South Africa eventually netted the bronze medal, while the senior Malcolm Spence from Jamaica, shortened his name to "Mal" while representing the British West Indies, achieved a bronze as part of their 4x400 metres relay, one second ahead of the 4th place South African team.

In the final, South African Malcolm Spence took off hard from the gun, making up the stagger and passing Milkha Singh to his outside before the second turn. Through the second turn, Otis Davis gained ground strongly, passing Spence to his outside halfway through the turn, emerging onto the home straight with the lead, two lanes inside of him Carl Kaufmann also gained on the turn and emerged slightly ahead of Spence. Kaufmann gained steadily on Davis but never caught him, desperately diving at the finish line from a half meter back but unable to get more than his head ahead of Davis.  Singh was the best of the rest, holding his own the second half of the race against the initial lead of Spence, but unable to gain much ground. Ultimately Spence held on for bronze.

Background

This was the fourteenth appearance of the event, which is one of 12 athletics events to have been held at every Summer Olympics. Of the finalists from 1956, bronze medalist Voitto Hellstén of Finland and sixth-place finisher Malcolm Spence returned in 1960. The field was relatively open, with no clear favorite.

Afghanistan, the Bahamas, the British West Indies, Ghana, Guyana, Tunisia, and Uganda appeared in this event for the first time. The United States made its fourteenth appearance in the event, the only nation to compete in it at every Olympic Games to that point.

Competition format

The competition retained the basic four-round format from 1920. There were 9 heats in the first round, each scheduled to have 6 or 7 athletes but with some dropping to as low as 4 after withdrawals. The top three runners in each heat advanced to the quarterfinals. There were 4 quarterfinals of 6 or 7 runners each; the top three athletes in each quarterfinal heat advanced to the semifinals. The semifinals featured 2 heats of 6 runners each. The top three runners in each semifinal heat advanced, making a six-man final.

Records

Prior to the competition, the existing World and Olympic records were as follows.

Otis Davis matched the Olympic record of 45.9 seconds in the quarterfinals. In the first semifinal, he set a new Olympic record at 45.5 seconds; by the end of the semifinals, four men had matched (Milkha Singh) or beaten (Malcolm Spence at 45.8 seconds, Carl Kaufmann at 45.7 seconds, and Otis at 45.5 seconds) the old record. In the final, the fifth- and sixth-place finishers (Manfred Kinder and Earl Young matched the old record—but still finished a full second behind the leaders, as Otis and Kaufmann broke the world record with 44.9 second finishes to take gold and silver. Singh's 45.6 seconds in the final set a national record that stood for 44 years.

Schedule

The semifinals and final were on different days for the first time since 1912.

All times are Central European Time (UTC+1)

Results

First round

The top three runners in each of the 9 heats advanced.

Heat 1

Heat 2

Heat 3

Heat 4

Heat 5

Heat 6

Heat 7

Heat 8

Heat 9

Quarterfinal round

The top three in each of the 4 heats advanced.

Quarterfinal 1

Quarterfinal 2

Quarterfinal 3

Quarterfinal 4

Semifinal round

The top three in each of the 4 heats advanced.

Semifinal 1

Semifinal 2

Final

References 

M
400 metres at the Olympics
Men's events at the 1960 Summer Olympics